Tracer is a 2022 South Korean television series starring Im Si-wan, Go Ah-sung, Son Hyun-joo and Park Yong-woo. The series revolves around the people working at the National Tax Service. It is an original drama of OTT media service Wavve and is available for streaming on its platform. It also aired on MBC TV from January 7 to March 25, 2022.

Series overview

Streaming

Television broadcast

Cast

Main
 Im Si-wan as Hwang Dong-joo, a former accountant who is now the head of the National Tax Service's Central Branch Tax Bureau.
 Park Min-soo as young Hwang Dong-joo
 Go Ah-sung as Seo Hye-young, a team member of the 5th Bureau of Taxation.
 Son Hyun-joo as In Tae-joon, the head of the Central Regional Tax Service.
 Park Yong-woo as Oh Young, the manager of the 5th Bureau of Taxation.

Supporting
 Chu Sang-mi as Min So-jeong, deputy commissioner of the National Tax Service Headquarters.
 Park Ji-il as Baek Seung-ryong, commissioner of the National Tax Service Headquarters.
 Choi Jun-young as In Do-hoon, Tae-joon's son who is the director of Inspection Division of the Central Regional Tax Office.
 Kim Do-hyun as Cho Jin-gi
 Kim Gook-hee as Noh Sun-joo
 Yoo Dong-hun
 Jang Seong-yoon
 Moon Su-in as Kim Han-bin
 Lee Jung-shik as Kim Young-tae
 Yeon Je-wook as Park Seong-ho
 Moon Won-joo as Ko Dong-won
 Shin Hyun-jong
 Song Duk-ho as Lee Choong-ho
 Kang Seung-ho as Han Kyung-mo
 Jeon Bae-soo as Jang Jeong-il

Special appearances
 Park Ho-san as Hwang Chul-min, Dong-joo's father.
 Woo Hyun as Yang Young-soon, a non-tax payer of one billion won in clone funds. 
 Im Seon-woo as Shin Da-hye, the director of Oz Foods who is being investigated for tax evasion by the five tax bureaus.
 Kim Tae-baek as Batnam, a whistleblower who accuses the unjust and brutal act of loan sharks.
 Kim Young-seong as the chief of Gold Cash.
 Lee Chang-hoon as Ryu Yong-shin, the financial director of PQ Group.
 Kim Soo-hyung as Hye-young's older sister.
 Jo Jun-hyung

Original soundtrack

Part 1

Part 2

Part 3

Part 4

Part 5

Part 6

Viewership

Awards and nominations

Notes

References

External links
  at Wavve 
  at MBC 
 
 

Korean-language television shows
MBC TV television dramas
South Korean action television series
South Korean thriller television series
2022 South Korean television series debuts
2022 South Korean television series endings
Wavve original programming